Macromolecular Theory and Simulations is a peer-reviewed scientific journal covering  polymer science. It publishes Reviews, Feature Articles, Communications, and Full Papers on all aspects from macromolecular theory to advanced computer simulation. According to the Journal Citation Reports, the journal has a 2020 impact factor of 1.530.

References

External links 
 

Chemistry journals
Materials science journals
Publications established in 1992
Wiley (publisher) academic journals
English-language journals
9 times per year journals